Steve(n) or Stephen Silver may refer to:

 Steven Silver (film director), film director
 Stephen Silver (born 1972), animator and cartoonist
 Stephen Winckworth Silver (1790–1855), clothier and outfitter
 Stephen William Silver (1819–1905), merchant and book collector, son of Stephen Winckworth Silver
 Steven H Silver (born 1967), science fiction editor and publisher
 Steven Silver (actor), television and film actor